In Confucianism, the Sangang Wuchang, sometimes translated as the Three Fundamental Bonds and Five Constant Virtues or the Three Guiding Principles and Five Constant Regulations, or more simply "bonds and virtues", are the three most important human relationships and the five most important virtues. They are considered the moral and political requirements of Confucianism as well as the eternal unchanging "essence of life and bonds of society."

History 
From the 11th century onward, Neo-Confucianism heavily emphasized the three bonds and five virtues, believing that humans could become sages through perfecting these relationships and virtues.

Meaning

Three Bonds 
The three bonds are between father and son, lord and retainer, and husband and wife and they constitute three of the five relationships described in the Mencius. According to Hsu Dau-lin, the concept of the Three Bonds was originally a Legalist idea.

Five Virtues 
The five most important virtues are benevolence (ren ), righteousness (yi ), propriety (li ), wisdom (zhi ), and trustworthiness (xin ). The first four virtues were grouped together in the Mengzi. The fifth virtue, xin, was added by Dong Zhongshu. Trustworthiness, or sincerity, is considered the most important of the five virtues, and the foundation for the other virtues. The remaining virtues derive from the Four Sprouts described by Mencius in the Confucian classic of the same name.

Benevolence is described as "forming one body" in relation to others, which requires seeing ourselves as extensions of others and vice versa. Paradigm cases of ren include acts of love or acting in others' interests, such as taking care of a family member.

Righteousness is when someone refuses to violate prohibitions that would be regarded as shameful or degrading such as bribery. Righteousness can be seen as the distribution of goods according to one's merit and position.

Propriety or li is broader in scope than the English word would entail. It is when someone performs a ritual with reverence, covering social protocol in situations that require a sense of respect, such as weddings, funerals, greetings, and serving food and drink.

Wisdom is understanding the other virtues' characteristic motives and feelings, correctly assessing the quality of a person's character, and knowing the best means to achieve virtuous ends.

Trustworthiness or faithfulness is understood as commitment to reality in a consistent and reliable way. Some Confucians did not consider xin to be its own domain of activity since it regulates and supports virtues. They all require one to be aware of what is real and avoid self-serving delusions.

See also 
 Three Obediences and Four Virtues

References

Bibliography 

 
 
 
 
 
 
 

Neo-Confucianism
Legalism (Chinese philosophy)
Social philosophy